The Miami Marlins were a minor league baseball team based in Miami, Florida. The original Marlins were a Triple-A franchise in the International League from 1956 through 1960. The International League team was succeeded by a Single-A team in the Florida State League (now the Fort Myers Mighty Mussels) and today's Miami Marlins (formerly the Florida Marlins) of Major League Baseball.

History
The International League Marlins were a transplanted version of the original Syracuse Chiefs, having been created on December 20, 1955, when the Syracuse club (a member of the IL as early as 1886 and a continuous member since 1934) was sold to Sidney Salomon (future founding owner of the St. Louis Blues of the National Hockey League) and Elliot Stein.

The 1955 Chiefs, an affiliate of the Philadelphia Phillies, finished only two games out of the playoffs, but drew only 85,000 fans, last in the eight-team league. In the Marlins' debut season in Miami, the club finished third and attracted 288,000 spectators, second in the IL circuit. Attendance dwindled in the following years, however, and by 1960 the Marlins—by then a Baltimore Orioles affiliate—were at the bottom of the IL, with fewer than 110,000 paying fans. The franchise signed a working agreement with the St. Louis Cardinals and moved to San Juan, Puerto Rico, in 1961, although after little more than a month of play the Marlins moved again to Charleston, West Virginia, on May 19.

In 1962, the franchise moved to Atlanta, discarding the Marlins name and adopting the Atlanta Crackers name, a team in the recently disbanded Class AA Southern Association.  

In 1966, when the Milwaukee Braves moved to Atlanta, the franchise relocated again to Richmond, Virginia, where it played as the Richmond Braves for 43 seasons, through .  

The franchise then moved to Gwinnett County, Georgia in 2009, and was known as the Gwinnett Braves through the 2017 season when the franchise became the Gwinnett Stripers in 2018. 

The former Syracuse Chiefs club, recently rebranded the Syracuse Mets for the 2019 season, reformed in 1961, and was actually the transplanted Montreal Royals (who, in turn, were originally based in Syracuse as the Stars prior to 1927).

Notable players
Notable Marlins during the 1956–60 period were veterans like Leroy "Satchel" Paige, the great former Negro leagues pitcher then in his 50s, three-time league all-star infielder Forrest "Woody" Smith, ex-New York Giants starting pitcher Rubén Gómez, two-time MLB All Star Sid Gordon, 1959 IL earned run average champ Artie Kay, former Brooklyn outfielder Cal Abrams, and fireballer Virgil Trucks. 

Their younger players included future big-leaguers like infielder Jerry Adair, outfielders Whitey Herzog and Dave Nicholson, and pitchers Rudy Árias, Don Cardwell, Turk Farrell, Jack Fisher and Dallas Green. 

Although its home park was Miami Stadium, on August 7, 1956, the largest crowd in minor league history (57‚000) came to see Miami's 50-year-old Paige beat Columbus at the Orange Bowl.

Yearly record

Legacy
In February 2008, it was announced that the big league Florida Marlins franchise would change its name to the Miami Marlins in 2012, upon moving into its new stadium, Marlins Park (now loanDepot Park) at the former site of the Orange Bowl.

In June 2013, a book titled: "The Forgotten Marlins: A Tribute to the 1956–1960 Original Miami Marlins" was published by Rowman & Littlefield written by author Sam Zygner.

In June 2019 a book titled: "Baseball Under the Palms History of Miami Minor League Baseball: The Early Years 1892-1960 (Volume I) was published by Sunbury Press written by authors Sam Zygner and Barbra Cabrera.

In May 2022 Volume II: "Baseball Under the Palms; The Later Years of the History of Miami Minor League Baseball"  will be released by Sunbury Press written by authors: Sam Zygner and Barbra Cabrera.

Affiliations
The IL Miami Marlins were affiliated with the following major league teams:

See also
Fort Myers Miracle

References

External links
Johnson, Lloyd, and Wolff, Miles, ed., The Encyclopedia of Minor League Baseball, 1997 edition. Durham, North Carolina: Baseball America.
International League: Encyclopedia II – International League – 1960–1969

Baseball teams established in 1956
Sports clubs disestablished in 1960
Defunct International League teams
Philadelphia Phillies minor league affiliates
Baltimore Orioles minor league affiliates
Baseball teams in Miami
Defunct baseball teams in Florida
1956 establishments in Florida
1960 disestablishments in Florida
Baseball teams disestablished in 1960